Lorne Lofsky (born May 10, 1954) is a Canadian jazz guitarist who was a member of the Oscar Peterson Quartet.

Lofsky began playing rock music at school dances but later took an interest in jazz after hearing the album Kind of Blue by Miles Davis. In the 1970s, he attended York University in Toronto and studied music while working at clubs in Toronto. He worked with Canadian musicians Butch Watanabe and Jerry Toth and with visiting Americans Pepper Adams, Bob Brookmeyer, and Chet Baker.

In 1980, Lofsky met Canadian pianist Oscar Peterson, who produced his first album, It Could Happen to You. He toured with Peterson in the 1980s, and he toured and recorded as a member of Peterson's quartet and quintet in the 1990s. Lofsky has also worked with Ed Bickert, Ruby Braff, Rosemary Clooney, Kirk MacDonald, Rob McConnell, Tal Farlow, Dizzy Gillespie, Johnny Hartman, and Clark Terry.

From 1983 to 1991 Lofsky played in a quartet with jazz guitarist Ed Bickert. This collaboration yielded two recordings (one of which was for the prestigious Concord label entitled This Is New) and a tour of Spain in 1991.

In the early-1980s, Lofsky began an important musical association with saxophonist Kirk Macdonald leading to the formation of a quartet. Various versions of this quartet have played numerous dates outside of Toronto, including the Atlantic Jazz Festival, Montreal's Upstairs Club, and Vancouver's Cotton Club.

Lofsky has taught at York University, Humber College's Community Music School, and the University of Toronto.

Discography 
 It Could Happen to You (Pablo, 1980)
 Ed Bickert, Lorne Lofsky and Friends, (Unisson, 1985)
 This is New, with Ed Bickert (Concord, 1990)
 Lorne Lofsky (Jazz Inspiration, 1992)
 Bill Please (Jazz Inspiration, 1994)
 This Song is New (Modica Music, 2021)

With Brass Connection
 Brass Connection, (Innovation, 1982)
 A New Look, (Innovation, 1984)
 A Five Star Edition, (Innovation, 1988)

With Oscar Peterson
 The More I See You, (Telarc, 1995)
 An Oscar Peterson Christmas (Telarc, 1995)
 Oscar in Paris (Live at Salle Pleyel) (Telarc, 1996)

With Kirk Macdonald
 The Atlantic Sessions (Koch, 1997)
 New Beginnings (Radioland, 1998)

With others
 This One's for Tedi, by Johnny Hartman (Audiophile, 1981)
 Chet Baker in Buffalo (CCB, 1984)
 Le Rouge by Duncan Hopkins with Kenny Wheeler, (1993)
 Don't Get Around Much Anymore, Rob McConnell's Boss Brass (Concord, 1995)
 One Take, Joey DeFrancesco (Alma)
 What Is This Thing?, Inside Out (Romhog, 2004)

References

External links
Official Website
 
 Eintrag (Grove Music Online)
 
 

1954 births
Canadian jazz guitarists
Canadian male guitarists
Canadian music educators
Concord Records artists
Living people
Canadian male jazz musicians
Musicians from Toronto
Telarc Records artists